Fontana Amorosa is a fresh water pool associated with Aphrodite, goddess of love, on the Akamas Peninsula, near Polis, 48 kilometres north of the city of Paphos, Cyprus.

References

Bays of Cyprus
Peninsulas of Cyprus